Templeton is a city in Carroll County, Iowa, United States. The population was 352 at the time of the 2020 census.

History
Templeton was platted in 1882. The city was probably named for a railroad worker. The city was incorporated on September 28, 1883.

The city is perhaps best known as the home of Templeton Rye, a "brand" of rye manufactured during the prohibition era that was very popular in Chicago, Omaha, and Kansas City speakeasies. Many enterprising Carroll County farmers found this to be a viable way to supplement income during the Great Depression. At the height of the bootlegging during the Great Depression, Templeton with a population of less than 500 people, was using three railroad cars of sugar a month.

Geography
Templeton is located at  (41.918073, -94.942540).

Demographics

2010 census
As of the census of 2010, there were 362 people, 156 households, and 107 families residing in the city. The racial makeup of the city was 98.6% White, 1.1% African American, and 0.3% Asian. Hispanic or Latino of any race were 0.3% of the population.

There were 156 households, of which 26.9% had children under the age of 18 living with them, 54.5% were married couples living together, 9.0% had a female householder with no husband present, 5.1% had a male householder with no wife present, and 31.4% were non-families. 27.6% of all households were made up of individuals, and 11.5% had someone living alone who was 65 years of age or older. The average household size was 2.32 and the average family size was 2.75.

The median age in the city was 43.6 years. 24.6% of residents were under the age of 18; 8.2% were between the ages of 18 and 24; 18.8% were from 25 to 44; 29.9% were from 45 to 64; and 18.5% were 65 years of age or older. The gender makeup of the city was 48.1% male and 51.9% female.

2000 census
As of the census of 2000, there were 334 people, 144 households, and 95 families residing in the city. The racial makeup of the city was 99.10% White, 0.30% African American and 0.60% Native American.

There were 144 households, out of which 29.9% had children under the age of 18 living with them, 60.4% were married couples living together, 4.2% had a female householder with no husband present, and 34.0% were non-families. 30.6% of all households were made up of individuals, and 18.1% had someone living alone who was 65 years of age or older. The average household size was 2.32 and the average family size was 2.93.

In the city, the population was spread out, with 25.4% under the age of 18, 6.3% from 18 to 24, 29.0% from 25 to 44, 20.1% from 45 to 64, and 19.2% who were 65 years of age or older. The median age was 39 years. For every 100 females, there were 90.9 males. For every 100 females age 18 and over, there were 94.5 males.

The median income for a household in the city was $37,500, and the median income for a family was $44,375. Males had a median income of $35,208 versus $18,750 for females. The per capita income for the city was $18,703. About 4.9% of families and 3.2% of the population were below the poverty line, including none of those under age 18 and 11.3% of those age 65 or over.

Education 
The public school district is the Carroll Community School District. A small section is within the IKM–Manning Community School District.

References

External links
 City of Templeton, Iowa Official Website Portal style website, Government, Business, Library, Recreation and more
 City-Data.com Comprehensive Statistical Data and more about Templeton

Cities in Carroll County, Iowa
Cities in Iowa
Populated places established in 1882
1882 establishments in Iowa